In rail transportation, a rolling highway or rolling road is a form of combined transport involving the conveying of road trucks by rail, referred to as Ro-La trains. The concept is a form of piggyback transportation.

The technical challenges to implement rolling highways vary from region to region. In North America, the loading gauge is often high enough to accommodate double stack containers, so the height of a semi-trailer on a flatcar is no issue. Making the wagon wheels smaller limits the maximum speed, so many designs allow the trailer to be transported with its wheels lower than the rail wagon wheels. An early approach in France was the Kangourou wagon with modified trailers. This technology did not survive, due to the market resistance to modified trailers. Today, three designs for these special wagons are in commercial service, "Modalohr", "CargoBeamer" and "Niederflurwagen"

.

During a rolling-highway journey, if the drivers accompany the trailer, they are accommodated in a passenger car or a sleeping car. At both ends of the rail link there are purpose-built terminals that allow the train to be easily loaded and unloaded.

Examples of rolling highways 
Rolling highways are mostly used for transit routes, e.g. through the Alps or from western to eastern Europe.

Austria 
In Austria, rolling highways exist from Bavaria via Tyrol to Italy or to Eastern Europe. Traditionally, Austria is a transit country and therefore the rolling highway is of environmental importance. In 1999 the Austrian Federal Railways (ÖBB) carried 254,000 trucks, which equals  of load (including vehicle's weight) (158,989 trucks in 1993). The rolling highway trains in Austria are operated by Ökombi GmbH, a division of Rail Cargo Austria, the cargo division of ÖBB. There is a direct rolling highway between Salzburg and the harbour of Trieste, Italy, where the trucks arrive on ferries from Turkey. In those cases, drivers arrive by plane via Ljubljana airport, to take over the trucks.

India 

In 1999, the Konkan Railway Corporation introduced the Roll On Roll Off (RORO) service on the section between Kolad in Maharashtra and Verna in Goa, which was extended up to Surathkal in Karnataka in 2004. The RORO service, the first of its kind in India, allowed trucks to be transported on flatcars. It was highly popular, carrying about 110,000 trucks and bringing in about 740 million worth of earnings to the corporation until 2007. These services are now being extended to other parts of India

Switzerland 
In Switzerland, rolling highways across the Alps exist for both the Gotthard and Lötschberg - Simplon route. They are operated by RAlpin AG, headquartered in Olten. On April 15, 2015, BLS cargo launched a service between Cologne and Milan capable of transporting 4-meter articulated lorry trailers.

Italy 
In 2018, 51% of the Ten-T network has been made adequate to P\C 80 loading gauge, required for ERA Technical Specifications for Interoperability to conveying road trucks by train. Further upgrades are underway.

France 
Two rolling highways are currently in operation in France, both using French Modalohr technology: the  Autoroute Ferroviaire Alpine, connecting the Savoy region to Turin through the Fréjus Rail Tunnel owned and operated jointly by SNCF and Trenitalia, and the   Lorry-Rail which connects Bettembourg, Luxembourg, to Perpignan operated by SNCF. Lorry-Rail only carries trailers, while the AFA carries accompanied and unaccompanied trailers. Since June 2012, these two are operated under the brand "VIIA" by SNCF Geodis.

In 2013, plans were announced to add more routes in France. One was planned to link Dourges (near Lille) to Tarnos (near Bayonne) in spring 2016
 and the other was an extension North from Bettembourg to Calais.  Eurotunnel announced its intention to build a terminal at Folkestone to extend the Dourges-Tarnos route to the UK
. However, in April 2015 the French ministry of transportation announced the cancellation of the Dourges - Tarnos route, citing financial concerns.

In July 2020, the government announced two further routes, Sète - Calais and Cherbourg - Bayonne.  French Transport Minister Jean-Baptiste Djebbari confirmed in September 2021 €15m funding in 2021 for further development of autoroutes ferroviaires including Calais – Sète, Cherbourg – Bayonne and Perpignan – Rungis. 

As of August 2021, the following routes are offered in France:

VIIA
 Calais - le Boulou (1200km, 22h)
 Calais - Mâcon 
 Calais - Orbassano (Italy)
 Mâcon - le Boulou
 Bettembourg (Luxembourg) - le Boulou
 Aiton - Orbassano

Cargobeamer
 Calais - Perpignan (1100km, 24h)
 Calais - Domodossola (Italy) (950km, 19h)

See also 
 ACTS, CargoBeamer, Car shuttle train, Modalohr, Motorail, Roadrailer; forms of road-rail intermodal transport
 Kangourou wagon
 Eurotunnel Shuttle
 Piggyback
 Pocket wagon
 Well car
 Well wagon

References

External links

Comparable concepts 
 Environmental Advantage
 Flexiwaggon, corporate website
 Kockums Megaswing 

Freight rolling stock
Intermodal transport
Trains